Sirivennela Seetharama Sastry (born Chembolu Seetharama Sastry; 20 May 1955 – 30 November 2021) was an Indian poet and lyricist known for his works in Telugu cinema and Telugu theatre. He acquired the stage name Sirivennela after writing the lyrics for K. Viswanath's directorial film of the same name in 1986. Sastry has garnered several awards including eleven state Nandi Awards and four Filmfare Awards South for his work. He has penned lyrics for over 3000 songs until 2020. In 2019, he was awarded the Padma Shri, the fourth-highest civilian award in India, for his contributions towards the field of arts and aesthetics.

Early life 
Chembolu Seetharama Sastry was born on 20 May 1955 in Anakapalli in Andhra Pradesh, India.

Career
Seetharama Sastry started his film career as a lyricist for K. Viswanath with Sirivennela.

A particular highlight of the movie is the song "Vidhata Thalapuna", sung by S. P. Balasubrahmanyam and P. Susheela. The song is about Aum, the most sacred syllable in Hinduism, from which the Veda traditions originated. Other notable songs include Adibhikshuvu Vadinedi Koredhi and Ee gali Ee Nela. The songs and their lyrics became hugely popular with Sastry subsequently winning his first Nandi Award for Best Lyricist for the song "Aadi Bhikshuvu". He won the Nandi Award for his first film.

He then wrote lyrics for many songs in films such as Swayam Krushi, Swarna Kamalam, Samsaram Oka Chadarangam, Shrutilayalu, and Pelli Chesi Choodu. The lyrics for these songs met with positive reception. He won his second Nandi Award for Best Lyricist for the song "Telavardemo Swamy" from the film Shrutilayalu and his third Nandi Award for Best Lyricist for the song "Andela Ravamidi Padamuladaa" from the film Swarna Kamalam in 1988. He is the first person to have won Nandi Awards in three consecutive years in 1986, 1987 and 1988.

He then wrote the lyrics to many songs from the films such as Swarakalpana, Anna Thammudu, Indrudu Chandrudu, Alludugaru, and Antam with all songs garnering positive reception. His lyrics for the film Gaayam were particularly well received, and Sastry was awarded his fourth Nandi Award for Best Lyricist for the song "Surajyamavaleni" in 1993.

He then wrote lyrics for many songs for films such as Kshana Kshanam, Swati Kiranam, Money, Govinda Govinda, Criminal, Gulabi, Love Birds (Telugu Version), Taraka Ramudu, Shubhalagnam, Srikaram and Little Soldiers. He won his fifth and sixth Nandi Award for Best Lyricist for the films Shubhalagnam and Srikaram respectively.

His next work was Ninne Pelladata, in which he was the single card lyricist.

He followed up with lyrics for songs in films such as Shubha Muhurtam, Priya Raagaalu, Aahaa..!, Pelli Kanuka, Sindhooram, Aavida Maa Aavide, Chandralekha, Wife of V. Varaprasad, Seetharama Raju, Prema Katha etc. His lyrics received positive reception and won him his seventh and eighth Nandi Award for Best Lyricist for the songs "Ardha Shatabdapu" (Sindhooram) and "Devudu Karunistadani" (Prema Katha).

He started 2000s by writing lyrics for films such as Murari, Oh Chinadana, Okkadu, Nuvve Kavali, Nuvvu Naaku Nachav, Manmadhudu, Ela Cheppanu, Varsham, Nuvvostanante Nenoddantana, Chakram, and Happy. Among these songs, "Hare Rama" (Okkadu), "Ekkada Unna" (Nuvve Kavali), "Aakasam Thakela" (Nuvvostanante Nenoddantana) and "Jagamantha Kutumbam" (Chakram) got positive reception with "Aakasam Thakela" winning him his first Filmfare Award for Best Lyricist – Telugu and "Jagamantha Kutumbam" winning him his ninth Nandi Award for Best Lyricist.

He followed up by writing lyrics for many songs from films such as Bommarillu, Aadavari Matalaku Ardhalu Verule, Gamyam, Sasirekha Parinayam, Jalsa, Parugu, Kotha Bangaru Lokam, Mahatma etc. "Entha Varaku" from Gamyam is often described as one of his best works and won him his tenth Nandi Award for Best Lyricist and second Filmfare Award for Best Lyricist – Telugu is for "Inthavaraku" from Gamyam, the third Filmfare Award for Best Lyricist – Telugu is for "Konthamandi Sontha Peru" from Mahatma & the fourth Filmfare Award for Best Lyricist – Telugu is for "Raa Mundaduguveddham" from Kanche.

In 2011, he wrote lyrics for "Badulu Thochani" (Mr. Perfect) with rave reviews for its lyrical content. He also wrote lyrics for many songs from the films such as Oh My Friend, Oosaravelli, Tuneega Tuneega, Onamalu, Krishnam Vande Jagadgurum, Seethamma Vakitlo Sirimalle Chettu, Greeku Veerudu, Paisa, Om 3D, Balupu, Anthaka Mundu Aa Tarvatha, Adavi Kaachina Vennela.

He is considered one of the greatest lyricists in Telugu Film Industry along with Veturi and Aatreya. Most of the younger lyricists like Chandra Bose, Ananth Sreeram and Rama Jogayya Sastri consider him as their guru. He has written over 3000 songs and was felicitated for this achievement in the Audio function of 2014 movie Mukunda. His lyrics for 2015 song "Mental Madhilo" from OK Bangaram have received praise. His lyrics for OK Bangaram have been considered very apt for a dubbed version. He was the speaker at the Telugu Association of North America's celebrations held in Chicago Illinois, U.S. 2–4 July 2009. In 2014, he was also felicitated by the Bay Area Telugu association.

Frequent collaborations

Seetharama Sastry is known to have a long time association with banners Annapurna Studios and Sumanth Art Productions and directors K. Viswanath, Ram Gopal Varma, Krishna Vamsi and Trivikram Srinivas.

For Annapurna Studios he has written lyrics for most of the songs from films such as Sisindri, Ninne Pelladata (involving Krishna Vamsi), Little Soldiers, Chandralekha (involving Krishna Vamsi), Yuvakudu, Sri Sita Ramula Kalyanam Chutamu Rarandi, Prema Katha (involving Ram Gopal Varma), Aahaa..!, Manmadhudu. Among them, for most films he was the single card lyricist (lyrics for all songs written by a single lyricist).

For Sumanth Art Productions, he contributed lyrics for films such as Manasantha Nuvve, Okkadu, Nee Sneham, Varsham, Nuvvostanante Nenoddantana, Pournami, Vaana and Aata and for most of the films he was the single card lyricist.

For Ushakiran Movies he wrote lyrics in films like Nuvve Kavali, Ishtam, Anandam.

With Ram Gopal Varma, he has worked on many films, contributing lyrics, such as Siva, Antam, Kshana Kshanam, Gaayam, Govinda Govinda, Rangeli (Telugu dubbed version of Rangeela), Anaganaga Oka Roju, 50-50 (Telugu dubbed version of Daud), Satya (Telugu dubbed version), Prema Katha and for many production ventures by Ram Gopal Varma such as Money, Gulabi etc. And for most of them, he was the single card lyricist.

With K. Viswanath, he has worked on many films including his debut venture Sirivennela, Sruthilayalu, Swayamkrushi, Swarna Kamalam, Aapadbandhavudu, Swati Kiranam, Subha Sankalpam etc. K. Viswanath is also known to have introduced Sirivennela Seetharama Sastry.

Krishna Vamsi is known to be a big fan of Sitarama Sastry. The films for which Sitarama Sastry wrote lyrics, which were directed by Krishna Vamsi include Ninne Pelladatha, Gulabi, Sindhooram, Chandralekha, Murari, Khadgam, Chakram, Mahatma etc. and more recently Paisa.

Trivikram Srinivas is a relative of Sirivennela Seetharama Sastry. Sitarama Sastry wrote lyrics to films directed by Trivikram such as Nuvve Nuvve, Athadu, Jalsa , Khaleja, Son of Satyamurthy, Agnyaathavaasi and Ala Vaikunthapurramuloo

Style

Seetharama Sastry's lyrics are known to have extreme optimistic value. Through his lyrics, he has time and again conveyed the essence of life by giving simple yet powerful examples and motivated people into living a happy, meaningful life irrespective of the hurdles one encounters. Some examples of this kind of song include "Aakasam Thakela" (Nuvvostanantey Nenoddantana, Prabhu Deva's directorial debut), "Entha Varaku" (Gamyam). Some of his songs also have rebellious tendencies, criticizing the shortcomings and social evils of society in songs like "Niggadeesi Adugu" (Gaayam), "Ardha Satabdhapu" (Sindhooram). He also wrote songs which have humour like "Vaareva Emi Face uu" (Money).
He was often considered the most versatile Telugu film lyricist working because he has contributed lyrics for songs comprising all kinds of genres like duets, hero introduction, romantic, devotional, thought provoking, lighter vein.

Other works
Seetharama Sastry was a celebrity actor for "Subhagruha", a real estate firm. His interpretation of his Lyrics & Poetry has been published as a book named Sirivennela Tarangalu.
Sitarama Sastry attended Loksatta Party on 3 March 2014 in a public event in Tirupati. In summer of 2014 along with singers Parthasaradhi (Parthu) and Sahithi, he toured many cities in United States presenting the concept behind the lyrics called "Sirivennela Antharangaalu".

Death 
Seetharama Sastry died on 30 November 2021 at Krishna Institute of Medical Sciences, Secunderabad, Telangana due to lung cancer. On 24 November 2021, he was admitted to KIMS hospital with pneumonia and was put on ECMO (extracorporeal membrane oxygenation) treatment for supporting his lungs.

Awards and honors

Civilian honors
Padma Shri (2019)

Nandi Awards
 Nandi Award for Best Lyricist – Sirivennela (1986) – "Vidhatha Thalapuna"
 Nandi Award for Best Lyricist – Sruthilayalu (1987) – "Telavaarademo Swami"
 Nandi Award for Best Lyricist – Swarnakamalam (1988) – "Andela Ravamidi Padamuladaa"
 Nandi Award for Best Lyricist – Gaayam (1993) – "Surajyamavaleeni Swarajyamendukani"
 Nandi Award for Best Lyricist – Subha Lagnam (1994) – "Chilaka Ee Thoodu Leeka"
 Nandi Award for Best Lyricist – Srikaram (1996) – "Manasu Kaastha Kalatha Padithe"
 Nandi Award for Best Lyricist – Sindhooram (1997) – "Ardha Sathabdapu Agnananne"
 Nandi Award for Best Lyricist – Prema Katha (1999) – "Devudu Karunistaadani"
 Nandi Award for Best Lyricist – Chakram (2005) – "Jagamanta Kutumbam Naadi"
 Nandi Award for Best Lyricist – Gamyam (2008) – "Enta Varaku Endu Koraku"
 Nandi Award for Best Lyricist - Seethamma Vakitlo Sirimalle Chettu (2013) - "Mari Anthagaa "

Filmfare Awards South
 Filmfare Award for Best Lyricist – Telugu – Nuvvostanante Nenoddantana (2005)
Filmfare Award for Best Lyricist – Telugu – Gamyam (2008)
Filmfare Award for Best Lyricist – Telugu – Mahatma (2009)
Filmfare Award for Best Lyricist – Telugu – Kanche (2015)
Santosham Film Awards

 Best Lyricist Award – Kanche (2015)

South Indian International Movie Awards
 SIIMA Award for Best Lyricist (Telugu) – Kanche (2015) 
Others
 He is a winner of the Bronzed Llama which he is noted for in his home town of Anakapalli.
 He was honored with Lifetime achievement award in January 2012.

Discography
This is a listing of the songs and tracks Sastry has contributed as a lyricist in the chronological order of films.

Notes

References

External links
 

1955 births
2021 deaths
Filmfare Awards South winners
Indian male film actors
Male actors from Andhra Pradesh
Male actors in Telugu cinema
Nandi Award winners
People from Uttarandhra
People from Visakhapatnam district
Recipients of the Padma Shri in arts
Santosham Film Awards winners
Telugu-language lyricists
Indian lyricists
Indian songwriters
Deaths from lung cancer in India
Telugu poets
Poets from Andhra Pradesh